Ulanga may refer to

 Ulanga River, a river of central Tanzania
 Ulanga District, a district of central Tanzania
 Ulanga, Morogoro, a village in Kilosa District, Tanzania
 Ulanga, Mbeya, a village in Mbarali District, Tanzania
 Boma ya Ulanga, a village in Morogoro Region, Tanzania